Robert Winthrop Chanler (February 22, 1872 – October 24, 1930) was an American artist and member of the Astor and Dudley–Winthrop families. A designer and muralist, Chanler received much of his art training in France at the École des Beaux-Arts, and there his most famous work, titled Giraffes, was completed in 1905 and later purchased by the French government. Robert D. Coe, who studied with him, described Chanler as being "eccentric and almost bizarre." Chanler rose to prominence as an acclaimed American artist when his work was exhibited in the 1913 Armory Show in New York City.

Family and early life

Chanler was born on February 22, 1872, in New York City to John Winthrop Chanler of the Dudley–Winthrop family and Margaret Astor Ward of the Astor family. Through his father, he was a great-great-grandson of Peter Stuyvesant and a great-great-great-great-grandson of Wait Winthrop and Joseph Dudley. Through his mother, he was a grandnephew of Julia Ward Howe, John Jacob Astor III, and William Backhouse Astor, Jr.

Robert had 10 brothers and sisters, including politicians Lewis Stuyvesant Chanler and William Astor Chanler. His sister Margaret Livingston Chanler served as a nurse with the American Red Cross during the Spanish–American War. Robert's eldest brother John Armstrong "Archie" Chanler married novelist Amélie Rives Troubetzkoy. His older brother Winthrop Astor Chanler served in the Rough Riders in Cuba and was wounded at the Battle of Tayacoba.

His siblings and he became orphans after the death of their mother in 1875 and their father in 1877, both to pneumonia. The children were raised at their parents' Rokeby Estate in Barrytown, New York. John Winthrop Chanler's will provided $20,000 a year for each child for life (equivalent to $470,563 in 2018), enough to live comfortably by the standards of the time. Several of Chanler's paintings still decorate the mansion at Rokeby.

Career

Like Mai Rogers Coe and Everett Shinn, Chanler was staying in Paris in the 1890s and became involved with the art community. When he returned to the U.S. in the early 1900s, he purchased a townhouse on East 19th Street, decorated it with his own works, and called it his House of Fantasy. The townhouse became a social center for New York's art community. Like Shinn, Chanler was a personality and a figure in his time.

Chanler was a member of the New York State Assembly (Dutchess Co., 2nd D.) in 1904, but did not run for re-election. In 1907, he was elected sheriff of Dutchess County, New York, and remained in that office for three years.

Chanler specialized in painted screens and was a member of the National Society of Mural Painters. A ceiling mural of buffaloes painted by Chanler is in the Coe House in Brookville, New York. He was also a member of the Architectural League of New York. He painted a ceiling inside the Colony Club, a private member's club located at Park Avenue and 62nd Street in New York City.

In 1905, Chanler exhibited a work entitled Au Pays des Girafes (or et argent) at the Salon d'Automne in Paris (no. 328 of the catalogue). This was the exhibition that prompted critic Louis Vauxcelles to label a group of painters "fauves" (wild beasts), thus marking the birth of Fauvism.

The Armory Show
  Chanler's work was featured in the 1913 Armory Show in New York, and he was one of the most acclaimed American artist in the exhibition. The elaborately painted screens he submitted were placed near the entrance of the show (Gallery A), where they captured the attention of the public and critics. Chanler's screen titled Hopi Indian Snake Dance was reproduced in the New York Herald, 15 February 1913. A work titled Porcupines was reproduced on postcard made for the Armory Show. Another screen by Chanler depicting porcupines is currently in the collection of the Metropolitan Museum of Art, New York. According to the catalogues for the Armory Show, Chanler was represented by nine screens at the New York venue and eight screens at the Art Institute of Chicago, but photographs and written sources, including Walter Pach's annotated New York catalogue and the Supplement to the New York catalogue located in the Armory Show records and the Walter Pach papers, indicate that around 25 screens were displayed during the three weeks in Manhattan, and at least nine at the Chicago exhibition.

Patrons and friends
Chanler's portrait, painted by his friend Guy Pène du Bois in 1915, came to epitomize the world of money, fashion, and status with which he was well acquainted.

Like many women of her class, Mai Rogers Coe was a patron of artists and had a taste for the elaborate, decorative works of Robert Winthrop Chanler. He painted decorative murals in Mai Coe's bedroom (1921) and in the family's breakfast room, the Buffalo Room (1920).

In 1918, Gertrude Vanderbilt Whitney commissioned Chanler to create a set of seven stained glass windows for her sculpture studio on MacDougal Alley in Greenwich Village. She asked Chanler to decorate the entire space and over a period of five years, he created an immense chimney-piece of three-dimensional flames, floor to ceiling, in plaster with additional inserts of bronze blazes. He covered the entire ceiling with plaster constellations and then created the windows. Chanler also designed murals for Gertrude's studio in Greenvale, New York, including a seaworld fantasy in the bathroom. The studio is extant and privately owned.

 Gertrude Vanderbilt and Mai Rogers Coe were perhaps Chanler's greatest patrons, but he received commissions from other wealthy families for decorative murals and screens. By 1920, when he completed the murals in the Buffalo Room, Chanler's work was well known. He later received favorable commentary in The Upholsterer and Interior Decorator magazine for his murals in Mai Coe's bedroom (1921) and in International Studio magazine for his painted screens (1922). Around this time, Chicago industrialist James Deering commissioned him to paint an "undersea fantasy" fresco on the ceiling of the indoor/outdoor swimming pool at Villa Vizcaya (1916–1925), Deering's winter home in Miami, Florida.

Chanler was close friends with Hervey White and a member of White's Woodstock artist colony in the early 1920s. White wrote of Chanler, "He could correlate his subjects in any period, the politics, sociology, and art. He could illustrate with the customs of the populace, he could give incidents for illustration of his points, then break off with a personal explanation of his conduct. He was a man of great emotion and great mind." Towards the end of his life, Chanler owned a house in Woodstock, where he exhibited his work in local exhibitions.

Personal life
 On April 12, 1893, he married Julia Remington Chamberlain, a daughter of William Chamberlain and Mary Bradhurst Remington. Julia's elder sister Alice was the first wife of Robert's elder brother Lewis. They had two daughters: Dorothy Chanler on November 24, 1898, and Julia Chanler on March 25, 1905.

The couple divorced on August 7, 1907. After his divorce from Julia, Chanler had a whirlwind romance with opera singer Natalina "Lina" Cavalieri. They married on June 18, 1910, but separated by the end of their honeymoon, and their divorce became final in June 1912. After the divorce, Lina returned to Europe, where she became a much-loved star in pre-Revolutionary St. Petersburg, Russia, and in Ukraine.

Chanler died on October 24, 1930, at an art colony in Woodstock, New York, after being in a coma for 12 hours.

Legacy
Chanler's work has been compared to the fantastical works of some renaissance painters. His works involve the use of sculpted gesso, transparent glazes, and gilded finishes to produce ornate and decorative designs. His work still exists in his family's estate, Rokeby near Barrytown, New York, the Luxembourg Museum, and in private collections across the country.

In 2010, Chanler's decorative plaster ceiling at the Gertrude Vanderbilt Whitney Studio was the focus of Lauren Drapala's Masters Thesis at the University of Pennsylvania. The ceiling, which had been painted over numerous times, was found to contain vivid colors amidst metallic overlays and glazes.

Extensive restoration of Chanler's murals and the painted plaster ceiling at Villa Vizcaya was begun in 2016.

References

Further reading
 Robert Winthrop Chanler: Discovering the Fantastic, Edited by Gina Wouters, Andrea Gollin, Foreword by Eve M. Kahn, Preface by Joel M. Hoffman, Photographer Whitney Cox; The Monacelli Press, May 2016

External links

 The Robert Winthrop Chanler exhibition (electronic resource). Catalog of an exhibition held 21 March – 21 April 1922
 New York Times, Art & Design, "A Painter’s Menagerie of Birds and Beasts Comes Back to Life"
 Slideshow showing two of Robert Chanler's paintings at the Rokeby Estate in 2010.
 Tad Richards, "Robert Chanler: Over the top wasn’t enough," Hudson Valley One, June 2, 2016
 Cara Despain, "Robert Winthrop Chanler," The Miami Rail
 "Cooper Hewitt Short Stories: The Fantastic Beasts of Robert Winthrop Chanler", Cooper Hewitt, Smithsonian Design Museum
 Wendy Moonan, "Robert W. Chanler's (Stained) Glass Menagerie," Introspective Magazine
 Slideshow featuring Chanler's decorative works at Gertrude Vanderbilt Whitney's Greenwich Village studio

1872 births
1930 deaths
Astor Orphans
19th-century American painters
American male painters
20th-century American painters
American muralists
Democratic Party members of the New York State Assembly
People from Barrytown, New York
American expatriates in France
Chanler family
Winthrop family
Sheriffs of Dutchess County, New York